In Hindu culture, a Pravara (Sanskrit for "most excellent") is a system of identity, particularly a family line. Pravaras is a particular Brahmin's descent from a rishi (sage) who belonged to their gotra (clan).

Significance 
The Pravara has been extensively used in identifying one's ancestry and thus giving salutations to the listener. In Vedic ritual, the importance of the pravara appears to be in its use by the ritualist for extolling his ancestry and proclaiming, "as a descendant of worthy ancestors, I am a fit and proper person to do the act I am performing." Generally, there are three, five or seven pravaras. The sacred thread yajnopavita worn on upanayana has close and essential connection with the concept of pravaras related to Brahmin gotra system. While tying the knots of sacred thread, an oath is taken in the name of each one of these three, five or seven of the most excellent rishis belonging to one's gotra.

The full affiliation consists of (1) Gotra, (2) Sutra (of Kalpa), (3) Shakha, (4) Pravaras .

For instance, a Brahmana named 'Rama' may introduce himself as follows: I am 'Rama', of Sarvarna gotra, of Gobhil sutra, of Taittiriya shākha of the Samveda, of five pravaras named Bhārgava, Chyāvana, Āpnavan, Aurva, and Jāmdagnya (This example is based upon the example given by Pattābhirām Shastri in the introduction to Vedārtha-Pārijata, cf. ref.) 

While the gotras were classified initially according to seven rishis, the pravaras were classified under the names of the following seven rishis: Agastya, Angirasa, Atri, Bhrigu (Bhargava), Kashyapa, Vashista, and Vishvamitra.

According to the listing of authors included in the verses in Rigved, the rishi Jamadagni was a descendant of rishi Bhrigu while the rishis Gautama and Bharadvaja were the descendants of rishi Angirasa.

The pravara identifies the association of a person with two, three (or sometimes five) of the above-mentioned rishis. It also signifies the Sutras contributed to different Vedas by those rishis.

Pravaras also help in identifying different gotras bearing the same name. For eg: Harita Gotra with Pravaras Angirasa, Ambarisha, Yuvanashva is different from Harita Gotra which has a single Pravara Vashishta.

Gotra Pravara

Vasistha: 
Vasistha, Saktya, Parāsara 
Kauṇḍinya, Maitravaruṇa, Vasiṣṭha
Kapisa: Angiras, Bharadwaja, Bārhaspatya, Vandana, Matavacha 
Kundina Gautama: Angiras, Āyāsya, Kuṇḍina Gautama
Bharadwāja: Aṅgiras, Bārhaspatya, Bharadwāja
Shaunaka: Bhārgava, Saunahotra, Gritsamada
Vadula: Bhārgava, Vaitahavya, Sāvedasa
Srivatsa and Vatsa: Bhārgava, Chyavana, Apnavān/Apnuvat, Aurava, Jāmadagnya (Paraśhurāma)
Sāvarṇa: Aurava, Chyavana, Bhārgava, Jamadagni, Apnuvat
ĀAtreya: Atreya, Archanās, Syavasva
Kauśika: Vaiśvāmitra, Agamarṣaṇa, Kausika
Kalabodhana/Kalabaudha: Visvamitra, Āgamarṣaṇa, Kālabodhana/Kālabaudha
Bhārgava: Bhārgava, Tvaṣṭā, Viśvarūpa
Visvāmitra: 
Vaisvāmitra, Devarāta, Autala 
Vaisvāmitra, Ashtaka
Kauṇḍinya: Vāsiṣṭha, Maitravāruṇa, Kauṇḍinya
Kapinjala: Vasiṣṭha, Aindrapramada, Abharadvāsavya
Harita/Haritasa: 
Harita, Ambarīisa, Yuvanasva
Angiras, Ambariṣa, Yuvanasva
Gautamas: Angiras, triyarushiya, pravaranvita
Maudgalya: (3 Variations) 
Angiras, Bharmyasva, Maudgalya
Tarkṣya, Bharmyasva, Maudgalya
Angiras, Dhavya, Maudgalya
Sandilya: (2 Variations) 
Kasyapa, Avatsara, Daivala

Kasyapa, Daivala, Asita
Naidhruvakasyapa: Kasyapa, Avatsara, Naidhruva
Kutsa: Angirasa, Mandhātā, Kautsa
Kapila: Angirasa, Amahaiya, Orukṣaya
Kanva: (2 Variations)
Angirasa, Ajamila, Kanva
Angirasa, Kaura, Kanva
Parasara: Vasiṣtha, Saktya, Parasarya
Upamanyu: Aindrapramada, Bhadravasavya
Āgastya: Agastya, Tardhachyuta, Saumavaha
Gārgi: (2 Variations)
Angirasa, Bharhaspatya, Bharadwaja, Sainya, Gargya
Angirasa, Sainya, Gargya
Bādarāyaṇa: Angirasa, Parsadaśva, Ratitara
Kasyapa: (3 Variations)
Kasyapa, Avatsara, Daivala
Kasyapa, Avatsara, Asita
Kasyapa, Avatsara, Naidhruva, Rebha, Raibha, Sandila and Sandilya
Sankṛti: (2 Variations)
Āngirasa, Kauravidha, Sankṛtya
Sadhya, Kauravidha, Sankṛtya
Suryadhwaja: Lakhi Maharṣi, Sorala, Binju
Daivaratasa: Visvamitra, Daivaratasa, Avudhala
Pauragutsa: Vidahavya, Travedasa, Tradadasyuhu
Ratitaras: Angirasa, Vairupya, Parshadas'va
Mauna Bhargavasa: Bhargava, Vitahavya, Savedasa

Example

Example transliteration of a pravara

चतुस्सगारा पर्यन्तं गो ब्रह्मणेभ्यः शुभम भवतु 
अन्गिरस भारद्वाज गार्ग्य शैन्य त्रयारिशयोः प्रवरांविता
गार्ग्य भारद्वाज गोत्रः आपस्तम्ब सूत्रः यजुह शाखाधायी
श्रीराम शर्मः अहम् भो अभिवादये ।।

Example (Bharadvajasya Gotram):

Chathusagara paryantham go-brahmane-bhyaha shubham bhavathu
Aangirasa, Bharaspatya, Bharadwajasya Triyarusheya pravaranvita Bharadvajasya grotraha apastamba sutrah yajush(Yajurveda) Saakhadhayi (Your Name) Sharma aham bho abhivadhaye:

Explanation of the example
Line 1: Prologue: May the world be blessed from all the cows and Brahmanas across the four seas

Line 2: The names and number of the main rishis to whose lineage the person belongs

Line 3: Gotra of the person

Line 4: The sutra that the person follows

Line 5: The veda shakha that the person belongs to

Line 6: Name of the person followed by 'SHARMA'

Line 7: Aham bho abhivadhaye meaning greetings/salutations

See also
List of Brahmin gotras

References

Caste system in India
Gotras
Kinship and descent
de:Gotra